Jan Mohammad Abbasi (Urdu جان محمدعباسي) was the Vice President of Jamaat-e-Islami Pakistan.

Contribution
Abbasi had been the Jamaat-e-Islami Pakistan's vice president for 27 years. He had earlier served the Muttahida Majlis-e-Amal as its Sindh chief. He contested the 1977 elections against the founder of the Pakistan People's Party Zulfiqar Ali Bhutto from Larkana constituency.

References

External links
Jamaat-e-Islami Pakistan (official)

Jamaat-e-Islami Pakistan politicians
Sindhi people
Pakistani scholars